Sepedonophilus perforatus is a species of centipede in the Geophilidae family. It is endemic to Australia, and was first described in 1887 by German entomologist Erich Haase.

Description
The original description of this species is based on a specimen measuring 50 mm in length with 79 pairs of legs.

Distribution
The species occurs in eastern Queensland. The type locality is Gayndah.

Behaviour
The centipedes are solitary terrestrial predators that inhabit plant litter, soil and rotting wood.

References

 

 
perforatus
Centipedes of Australia
Endemic fauna of Australia
Fauna of Queensland
Animals described in 1887
Taxa named by Erich Haase